
Year 179 BC was a year of the pre-Julian Roman calendar. At the time it was known as the Year of the Consulship of Flaccus and Fulvianus (or, less frequently, year 575 Ab urbe condita). The denomination 179 BC for this year has been used since the early medieval period, when the Anno Domini calendar era became the prevalent method in Europe for naming years.

Events 
 By place 

 Roman Republic 
 Tiberius Sempronius Gracchus goes to Hispania as Roman governor to deal with uprisings there.
 The Pons Aemilius is completed across the Tiber River in Rome. It is regarded as the world's first stone bridge.
 Marcus Aemilius Lepidus is appointed both censor and princeps senatus.

 Greece 
 Philip V of Macedon dies at Amphipolis in Macedonia, remorseful for having put his younger son Demetrius to death, at the instigation of his older son Perseus. Nevertheless, he is succeeded by his son Perseus.

 Asia Minor 
 Eumenes II of Pergamum defeats Pharnaces I of Pontus in a major battle. Finding himself unable to cope with the combined forces of Eumenes and Ariarathes IV of Cappadocia, Pharnaces is compelled to purchase peace by ceding all his conquests in Galatia and Paphlagonia, with the exception of Sinope.

Births 
 Dong Zhongshu, Chinese scholar who is traditionally associated with the promotion of Confucianism as the official ideology of the Chinese imperial state (d. 104 BC)
 Liu An, Chinese prince, geographer, and cartographer (d. 122 BC)
 Sima Xiangru, Chinese statesman, poet, and musician (d. 117 BC)

Deaths 
 Liu Xiang, Chinese prince involved in the Lü Clan Disturbance in 180 BC and grandson of Emperor Gao of Han
 Philip V, king of Macedonia from 221 BC, whose attempt to extend Macedonian influence throughout Greece has occurred at a time of growing Roman involvement in Greek affairs and resulted in his military defeat by Rome (b. 238 BC)

References